Nonia belizae is a species of snout moth in the genus Nonia. It was described by Herbert H. Neunzig and L. C. Dow in 1993 and is known from Belize (including San Ignacio, the type location).

References

Moths described in 1993
Endemic fauna of Belize
Phycitinae